Doraemon+ (ドラえもん＋) is a collection of "short story" chapters of Fujiko F. Fujio's Doraemon (as opposed to the so-called "long story" standalone volumes of Daichōhen Doraemon) that did not make the 45 published volumes. It was released as six volumes between April 25, 2005, to December 6, 2014; however, 122 more chapters are not included in these six volumes as well.

Genre: Adventure, Comedy, Fantasy, Sci-fi

List of Chapters

Volume 1 (04/25/2005) 
 Chapter 01 – A Partial Gourmet Table
 Chapter 02 – A Tickling Glove
 Chapter 03 – For Me to Stop Nobita
 Chapter 04 – Substitute Stickers
 Chapter 05 – Traveling Half Cloud
 Chapter 06 – A Friendship Chocolate
 Chapter 07 – Secret Keeper Dog
 Chapter 08 – A Chasing T
 Chapter 09 – A Concentration Soap Helmet
 Chapter 10 – A Preference Photo Printer
 Chapter 11 – An Elephant Trunk Lipstick
 Chapter 12 – Flower Recorder
 Chapter 13 – A Mirage Candle
 Chapter 14 – A Lucky Bee
 Chapter 15 – Future Telling Radio
 Chapter 16 – A Wrapping Cloth to Carry Someone
 Chapter 17 – A Thrill Tickets
 Chapter 18 – Miss Fortunate from Nobita's Point of View
 Chapter 19 – I Want a Strong Pet
 Chapter 20 – A Story of Bell Crickets
 Chapter 21 – Set the Room Guard
 Chapter 22 – Study for the Test You Hate

Volume 2 (08/25/2005) 
 Chapter 01 – A Fan to Change One's Mind
 Chapter 02 – Who's the Real Thief
 Chapter 03 – A Ghost Story
 Chapter 04 – A Substitute Television
 Chapter 05 – An Absconding Scroll
 Chapter 06 – Nobita's Iron Body
 Chapter 07 – Spying Vines
 Chapter 08 – An Unpleasant Feeling Measuring Device
 Chapter 09 – Plan to Escape from the Earth
 Chapter 10 – A Command Gun
 Chapter 11 – A Dream’s Director Chair
 Chapter 12 – A Complete Restoration Liquid
 Chapter 13 – Super Giant
 Chapter 14 – A  Mechine
 Chapter 15 – A Summon Buzzer
 Chapter 16 – A Future Nobita
 Chapter 17 – A Salary Riot
 Chapter 18 – Human Programming Pill
 Chapter 19 – Pinch Runner
 Chapter 20 – Pet Pen
 Chapter 21 – Time Pistol to Eliminate Obstacle

Volume 3 (10/25/2005) 
 Chapter 01 – Sound Camera
 Chapter 02 – Courage Test Glasses
 Chapter 03 – Would You Be Okay If Doraemon Wasn't Here?!
 Chapter 04 – An Uproar Caused by a Popular Badge
 Chapter 05 – Where Were You at That Time?
 Chapter 06 – A Monster Box
 Chapter 07 – Turnover Dynamite
 Chapter 08 – A Grateful Ring
 Chapter 09 – An Indoor World Travel Set
 Chapter 10 – Patrol Car of Justice
 Chapter 11 – A Flying Paper
 Chapter 12 – A Duplication Balloon
 Chapter 13 – A Deposit Card
 Chapter 14 – A Sneezing Powder
 Chapter 15 – Hologram Machine
 Chapter 16 – Super Speed Goggles
 Chapter 17 – A Fear Maker Machine
 Chapter 18 – Petter
 Chapter 19 – Shyara Gum
 Chapter 20 – Muscle Control
 Chapter 21 – A Cockroach Doll

Volume 4 (01/25/2006) 
 Chapter 01 – A Million Volt Man
 Chapter 02 – Taking Scoop Picture with Chance Camera
 Chapter 03 – A Fake Scribble Pen
 Chapter 04 – Mini Santa
 Chapter 05 – The Treasure Hunting Paper
 Chapter 06 – A Child of Wind Band
 Chapter 07 – A Robot Pet Dog
 Chapter 08 – A Part Time Job for a Yeti
 Chapter 09 – Teletelephone
 Chapter 10 – Image Gum
 Chapter 11 – A Misfortunate Forecast Machine
 Chapter 12 – An Animal Training Shop
 Chapter 13 – A Paper Plane
 Chapter 14 – Traffic Mark Stickers
 Chapter 15 – Energy Saving Hot Air Balloon
 Chapter 16 – A Revenge Band
 Chapter 17 – A Comrade Badge
 Chapter 18 – A Human Task Time Switch
 Chapter 19 – All Purpose Glasses
 Chapter 20 – Doraemon and Dorami-chan

Volume 5 (03/25/2006) 
 Chapter 01 – Sparta Victory Pills and Hater Touch Baton
 Chapter 02 – A Dream Coder
 Chapter 03 – A Secret Story
 Chapter 04 – Air Conditioner Photo
 Chapter 05 – The Famous Singer, Tsubasa-chan, Has a Secret
 Chapter 06 – A Falling Star Catcher
 Chapter 07 – Obedience Hat
 Chapter 08 – A Great Shell Set
 Chapter 09 – A Snow in March
 Chapter 10 – A Magic Map
 Chapter 11 – A Care-Giver Robot
 Chapter 12 – A Fake Telephone Adapter
 Chapter 13 – Ignorant Bug
 Chapter 14 – Traffic Protection Time
 Chapter 15 – Firecracker Paper
 Chapter 16 – Use Combine Glue for Hiking
 Chapter 17 – Pencil Missile and Counter Attack Radar
 Chapter 18 – An Ultra Super Deluxe Pill
 Chapter 19 – A Confession Hat
 Chapter 20 – 45 Years Later

Volume 6 (12/01/2014) 
 Chapter 01 — The Lost Treasure of Minikini
 Chapter 02 — Nobita 2.0
 Chapter 03 — Cosmic Kockets 
 Chapter 04 — The Really, Really Bad Temper 
 Chapter 05 — The Troubles with Nobita
 Chapter 06 — Operation: B.U.L.L.Y 
 Chapter 07 — Nobita-It Is 
 Chapter 08 — The Enchanted Land of Nobitanna
 Chapter 09 — Nobita and Gian in Black-and-White 
 Chapter 10 — The Spy Who Seed Me
 Chapter 11 — It's a Spoonful Life!
 Chapter 12 — The Sick Joke 
 Chapter 14 — No Friend Accustomed, No Present 
 Chapter 15 — The Sword in the Throne
 Chapter 16 — The Christmas Trap
 Chapter 17 — Nobita on the Prairie 
 Chapter 18 — Nobita the Kid

References 

Doraemon lists
Lists of manga volumes and chapters